Egil Ulfstein (born 1 October 1971) is a retired Norwegian football defender.

A son of IL Hødd legend Jan Ulfstein, Egil Ulfstein played for Hødd himself and represented Norway on u-21 level. Ahead of the 1993 season he was bought by Viking, moving to Brann in 1998. He was also capped twice for Norway in a 1995 tour of the Caribbean. In the 2004 season he only featured in a single match, a cup thrashing of Hødd. Brann and Ulfstein went on to become cup champions, but Ulfstein retired after the season.

References

1971 births
Living people
People from Ulstein
Norwegian footballers
IL Hødd players
Viking FK players
SK Brann players
Norwegian First Division players
Eliteserien players
Association football defenders
Norway youth international footballers
Norway under-21 international footballers
Norway international footballers
Sportspeople from Møre og Romsdal